Dromiskin (historically Druminisklin, from ) is a village and townland in County Louth, Ireland. It is situated 10 km south of Dundalk, about 1 km inland from the Irish coast.

History

The village was home to a monastery for hundreds of years, which was reputedly associated with Saint Patrick. The first bishop of Dromiskin was Lughaidh, son of Aengus mac Nadfraoch the first Christian king of Munster. St Patrick reputedly pierced Aengus's foot with his pastoral staff during the baptism.

Áed Findliath monarch of Ireland, son of Niall Caille, retired to and died at Dromiskin. The Chronicon Scotorum records his death at 879. O'Donovan records his death as 876 and the Annals of Ulster place it at 878.

The next few hundred years were turbulent times for Dromiskin. The constant plundering by both Vikings and Irish destroyed the Abbey and dispersed the monks. Annudh macRuaire rampaged through the territory in 1043 and Dromiskin was destroyed. The ecclesiastical site was abandoned and the monks took refuge in the neighbouring Abbey of Saint Mochta, the possessions of this ancient church being placed in the hands of the Prior of Louth Abbey.

Dromiskin served as the home to the Archbishops of Armagh for a time. The Archbishops of Armagh lived at Dromiskin House. Archbishop Milo Sweetman is buried here.

The old ninth-century round tower and parts of the Abbey still remain. From the tower, there is a view of all of Dundalk Bay and the surrounding countryside.

Parish
The village is part of the parish of Darver and Dromiskin parish, Darver being a neighbouring village. The parish is bounded by the Fane River on the north and by the Glyde River on the south.

Demographics
Since the mid-1990s, Dromiskin, like many areas in County Louth, has seen an increase in population. In 2006, 992 people were living in Dromiskin. By 2016, the population of the village had increased to 1,195. According to 2016 census figures, 221 of the village's 391 private houses were built between 1991 and 2010.

Sport
The local Gaelic football club, St. Joseph's, was formed in 1961. It covers the entire parish of Darver & Dromiskin, and won the Senior county championship (Joe Ward Cup) in 1996 and 2006. 

As of 2011, the club was playing Intermediate level championship as well as Division 2 league football, having been relegated from League Division 1 in 2010. The club's Minor (U-18) team won the county championship for the first time in 2009 and retained the championship in 2010. St Peter's Athletic Club is located in the outskirts of the village.

Transport

Bus Éireann route 168, Annagassan to Dundalk serves Dromiskin Mondays to Fridays inclusive providing one journey in each direction.

See also
List of abbeys and priories in Ireland (County Louth)
List of towns and villages in Ireland

References

External links

St. Peter's National School Website

Towns and villages in County Louth
Townlands of County Louth
Towers in the Republic of Ireland